Jennifer Rosanne States was a black Canadian child who died at age three in September 1968 and made national headlines when she was refused burial in an all-white cemetery.

States had been very ill from soon after birth. Her parents, with six other young children, were unable to care for her and sent her to a white foster family in Windsor, Nova Scotia. When she died this family tried to have her buried in the St. Croix Cemetery. However, the managing board cited a 1907 bylaw banning blacks and natives from the cemetery. States was instead buried in a traditionally black cemetery nearby. The incident came to the attention of the national media and caused a general outcry. The cemetery board quickly backed down and deleted the offending bylaw.

See also
Africville
Viola Desmond

References
"N.S. Cemetery Cites 1907 Bylaw, Refuses Burial for Negro Child, 3." The Globe and Mail. October 11, 1968. pg. A1.
"Cemetery Deletes Bylaw Banning Negro Burial." The Globe and Mail. October 12, 1968. pg. A1.
 We're Rooted Here and They Can't Pull Us Up. By Peggy Bristow, Dionne Brand, Linda Carty, Afua Cooper, Sylvia Hamilton. Footnote, page 38
The Chronicle-Herald (Halifax, N.S.), October 12, 1968, page 1.

1965 births
1968 deaths
Black Nova Scotians
People from Windsor, Nova Scotia